The Town of Danville is located in the San Ramon Valley in Contra Costa County, California. It is one of the incorporated municipalities in California that use "town" in their names instead of "city". The population was 43,582 at the 2020 census. Since 2018, for four years in a row, Danville was named "the safest town in California".

The Iron Horse Regional Trail runs through Danville. Extending from Livermore to Concord, the trail passes through Danville.

Danville is also home to the Eugene O'Neill National Historic Site, Village Theatre and Art Gallery, and the Museum of the San Ramon Valley.

History

Often referred to as the "Heart of the San Ramon Valley," Danville was first populated by Native Americans who lived near creeks and camped on Mount Diablo in the summer. Later, it was part of Mission San José's grazing land as well as a Mexican land grant called Rancho San Ramon.

Initially a farming community, the Town of Danville switched from wheat to fruits and nuts after the Southern Pacific Railroad built a spur line through the area in 1891. It developed as a residential suburb in 1947 when the first sizable housing tracts were constructed and its population boomed in the 1970s and 1980s.

The Danville Post Office opened in 1860 with hotel owner Henry W. Harris as the first postmaster.

Churches, schools, farmers unions and fraternal lodges began as the community grew. The Union Academy, a private high school begun by the Cumberland Presbyterian Church, served the county from 1859 to 1868, until it burned down. Danville Presbyterian Church was dedicated in 1875.

Many early Danville buildings remain standing today. The original 1874 Grange Hall exists as well, and the original Danville Hotel remains downtown which was last renovated in 2016. Many of the early pioneer names appear on the streets and schools, including Baldwin, Harlan, Wood, Love, Hemme, Boone, Bettencourt and Meese.

When the Southern Pacific Railroad came to the Valley in 1891, Danville continued to grow. Farmers built warehouses and shipped crops by rail, and residents were able to travel to and from Danville.

John Hartz sold  of his land for the Danville Depot and granted land access to the station. He then subdivided and sold lots east of the station, shifting the town's focus from Front Street to Hartz Avenue. Eventually, a bank, drug store, saloon, doctor's office and Chinese laundry joined the houses lining the street. The Danville Hotel originally sat across from the station and was moved to face Hartz avenue in 1927.

The twentieth century found Danville affected by the wars, the Spanish flu, the depression, and new immigrants.

In 1910, a public high school district was organized and San Ramon Valley Union High School was built. A library opened in 1913 with 104 books. St. Isidore's Catholic Church was first established in 1910. An Improvement League funded the first streetlights and paved roads in 1915.

Danville continued as farm country into the 1940s. The Valley had a population of 2,120 people in 1940, growing to 4,630 by 1950. Developments such as Montair and Cameo Acres were built, the water and sewer districts extended their boundaries, and the new I-680 freeway which cut through Danville in the mid-1960.

In 1982, Danville citizens voted to incorporate their community.

In 2000, Danville's population reached 40,484.

Danville was ranked as the safest city in California for a fourth year in a row, most recently in 2021.

Geography

Danville is set in a narrow section of the San Ramon Valley with the Las Trampas Ridge to the west and the Diablo Range to the east. Sycamore Creek drains some of the Mount Diablo slopes and flows through Danville.

To the north of Danville, the unincorporated town of Alamo sits in the uppermost reaches of the San Ramon Valley and extends into the surrounding hills. San Ramon, another affluent suburb, borders Danville to the south.

Interstate 680, extending along the valley to the north and south, is the main route used by traffic in and out of town. Camino Tassajara is the main thoroughfare for east–west travel, most importantly to reach the eastern subdivisions far from the interstate. Camino Tassajara also provides access to the wealthy gated community of Blackhawk.

Climate
Danville's weather typifies a Mediterranean climate. Summers are long, with hot days and cool nights. Winters are cool, with mild daytime temperatures usually in the 50s, and nighttime temperatures usually above freezing. Like in the rest of the Bay Area, summers in Danville are extremely dry, and it's not uncommon for four to six months to elapse between the last drop of rain in the spring and the first rain in the fall. Winters are rainy, but periods of several days to a week of mild, dry, sunny weather are quite common even in midwinter.

Demographics
{{US Census population
|1960= 3585
|1970= 14059
|1980= 26446
|1990= 31306
|2000= 41715
|2010= 42039
|2020= 43582
|footnote=source:<ref>Area reported as Alamo-Danville during the 1970 census, which recorded a population of 14,059. (The separate communities of Alamo and Danville were not returned separately by the census).</ref>
}}
According to Business Insider, Danville's 94506 is the 14th wealthiest zip code in America. Danville is one of the wealthiest suburbs of Oakland and San Francisco. Danville also ranks as the 2nd highest-income place in the United States with a population of at least 40,000. It is home to some of the most expensive real estate in the San Francisco Bay Area and the United States. According to CNN Money, Danville's 94506 also has the fourth highest percentage of six-figure income earners in the nation, with 78% of Danville households having at least a six-figure income.

2010
The 2010 United States Census reported that Danville had a population of 42,039. The racial makeup of Danville was 34,942 (83.1%) White, 372 (0.9%) African American, 67 (0.2%) Native American, 4,417 (10.5%) Asian, 68 (0.2%) Pacific Islander, 509 (1.2%) from other races, and 1,664 (4.0%) from two or more races. Hispanic or Latino of any race were 2,879 persons (6.8%).

The Census reported that 41,796 people (99.4% of the population) lived in households, 56 (0.1%) lived in non-institutionalized group quarters, and 187 (0.4%) were institutionalized.

There were 15,420 households, out of which 6,034 (39.1%) had children under the age of 18 living in them, 10,389 (67.4%) were opposite-sex married couples living together, 1,140 (7.4%) had a female householder with no husband present, 449 (2.9%) had a male householder with no wife present.  There were 452 (2.9%) unmarried opposite-sex partnerships, and 84 (0.5%) same-sex married couples or partnerships. 2,801 households (18.2%) were made up of individuals, and 1,365 (8.9%) had someone living alone who was 65 years of age or older. The average household size was 2.71.  There were 11,978 families (77.7% of all households); the average family size was 3.10.

The population was spread out, with 11,196 people (26.6%) under the age of 18, 2,117 people (5.0%) aged 18 to 24, 8,050 people (19.1%) aged 25 to 44, 14,628 people (34.8%) aged 45 to 64, and 6,048 people (14.4%) who were 65 years of age or older.  The median age was 44.5 years. For every 100 females, there were 93.5 males.  For every 100 females age 18 and over, there were 90.3 males.

The homeowner vacancy rate was 0.8%; the rental vacancy rate was 5.3%.  36,137 people (86.0% of the population) lived in owner-occupied housing units and 5,659 people (13.5%) lived in rental housing units.

Arts and culture

Museums and historic sites
 Eugene O'Neill National Historic Site - Tao House.
 Museum of the San Ramon Valley (located in the restored 1891 Southern Pacific depot)
 Blackhawk Museum
 All Wars Memorial  (located in Oak Hill Park - est. 2005)
 Veterans Memorial Building of San Ramon Valley

Libraries
The Danville Library of the Contra Costa County Library is located in Danville.  It is one of the busiest libraries in Contra Costa County by circulation.

Seasonal events
 The Kiwanis Fourth of July parade attracts over 40,000 people each year.
 Hot Summer Sundays Car Shows, which is held on Hartz Avenue in Downtown Danville in July and August, features hundreds of vintage pre-1960s automobiles on display with live music.
 The FallFest in late October draws craftspeople and artists to the area. 
 Annual lighting of the Danville Oak Tree at Christmas

Parks and recreation

 Mount Diablo State Park
 Las Trampas Regional Wilderness
 Front Street Park
 Baldwin School Park
 Danville South Park
 Diablo Vista Park
 Green Valley School Park
 Greenbrook School Park
 Montair School Park
 Oak Hill Park
 Osage Station Park
 Sycamore Valley Park
 Hap Magee Ranch Park
 Bret Hart Park

Government

According to the California Secretary of State, as of February 10, 2019, Danville has 30,076 registered voters. Of those, 10,412 (34.6%) are registered Democrats, 10,381 (34.5%) are registered Republicans, and 7,963 (26.5%) have declined to state a political party.

Throughout its history until 2008, Danville was a Republican stronghold in presidential elections. Ronald Reagan carried it by a 3-to-1 margin in 1984. However, in 2008, Barack Obama became the first Democrat to carry Danville in a presidential election. He narrowly won it again in 2012 with a plurality. Hillary Clinton carried it in 2016 by nearly 24 points and Joe Biden won it by nearly 29 points in 2020.

The Town of Danville has a Council–manager government, with a five-person Town Council and an appointed Town Manager. Council members' terms are four years. Each year, in December, the council selects a new mayor to take office in January. The current Mayor of Danville is Newell Arnerich.

Danville has its own police department, which consists of 42 full-time employees, including 30 Officers and 12 civilian support staff. In addition, it has 8 Reserve officers and 32 volunteers. Allan Shields is the current police chief.

The San Ramon Valley Fire Protection District (SRVFPD) provides fire protection for Danville. A Special District, it covers 155 square miles includes the following communities: Alamo, Blackhawk, Diablo, the City of San Ramon, the southern boundary of Morgan Territory and the Tassajara Valley, all located in Contra Costa County.

Education
Public schools
Danville Schools are included in the San Ramon Valley Unified School District.

 (John) Baldwin Elementary School 
 Del Amigo High (Continuation)
 Diablo Vista Middle School
 Creekside Elementary School
 Green Valley Elementary School
 Greenbrook Elementary School
 Los Cerros Middle School
 Montair Elementary School
 Monte Vista High School
 Sycamore Valley Elementary School
 Tassajara Hills Elementary School
 Vista Grande Elementary School
 Charlotte Wood Middle School
 San Ramon Valley High School

Private schools
 San Ramon Valley Christian Academy (Christian)
 St. Isidore's School (Roman Catholic)
 The Athenian School (non-denominational)

 Notable people 
 Larry Allen – football player, 14-year NFL career, member of Super Bowl XXX champion Dallas Cowboys
Alissa Anderegg – Miss World America 2020
Billy Beane – Major League Baseball player, front office executive for the Oakland Athletics, subject of the book and film Moneyball Doug Bowser - businessman, president of Nintendo of America
 D'Arcy Carden - actress, The Good Place Leroy Chiao – astronaut
 E-40 – rapper; lives in Danville
 Elizabeth Emken  – politician
 Zach Ertz - tight end for NFL's Arizona Cardinals; attended Monte Vista High School
 Draymond Green – power forward for NBA's Golden State Warriors
 Dallas Jaye - Soccer player who has played professionally in the United Soccer League
 Duane Kuiper - Major League Baseball player and broadcaster for the San Francisco Giants
 Nate Landman, NFL linebacker; attended Monte Vista High School
 Jason Lucash  – inventor of Origaudio
 Mark Madsen - NBA player and coach; attended San Ramon Valley High School
 Judah Miller - screenwriter and producer
 Murray Miller - screenwriter and producer
 Joe Morgan – Baseball Hall of Fame second baseman
 Sara Jane Moore – attempted to assassinate President Gerald Ford
 Bob Myers - general manager of NBA champion Golden State Warriors; born in Danville
 Vince Neil - vocalist of Mötley Crüe
 Jeff Newman - MLB All-Star baseball player and manager
 Evan O'Dorney – winner of 80th Scripps National Spelling Bee in 2007
 Eugene O'Neill – only Nobel Prize-winning American playwright; wrote the three plays now generally considered his best work while living at Tao House (now the Eugene O'Neill National Historic Site) between 1937 and 1944
 Greg Papa - broadcaster for San Francisco 49ers
 A. J. Puckett - baseball player for Chicago White Sox; born in Danville
 Nate Schierholtz - baseball player; attended San Ramon Valley High School
 Adam Schiff - U.S. Representative; attended Monte Vista High School
 Russell Simpson - actor
 Greg Sestero - actor; attended Monte Vista High School
 Chesley B. "Sully" Sullenberger – pilot of US Airways Flight 1549 who made an emergency water landing in the Hudson River and is credited with saving the lives of all 155 crew and passengers
 Nancy Tellem (born 1952), chief media officer and executive chairwoman of Eko
 Mark Tollefsen (born 1992) - basketball player, 2018-19 top scorer in the Israel Basketball Premier League
 Christy Turlington - supermodel; attended Monte Vista High School
 Dana Vollmer – Olympic swimmer, 2004, 2012 and 2016 gold medalist
 Joey Wagman - baseball pitcher
 Andre Ward – professional boxer
 Randy Winn - MLB outfielder 1998–2010; attended San Ramon Valley High School
 Chris Wondolowski - soccer player for San Jose Earthquakes and United States men's national soccer team; born in Danville
 Kevin Woo - vocalist for band U-KISS; born in Danville
 David Zuckerman - writer, producer of Family Guy''; born in Danville

See also

References

External links
 
 Danville Chamber of Commerce

 
1982 establishments in California
Cities in Contra Costa County, California
Cities in the San Francisco Bay Area
Incorporated cities and towns in California
Populated places established in 1982